Clinton High School in Clinton, Tennessee, is the Anderson County, Tennessee, high school that serves students living in and near Clinton, Oliver Springs, and Claxton.

History 

1806     Union Academy, a state-sponsored institution, was chartered for Anderson County.

1820s     Union Academy began operations. A wooden structure was built on South Main Street in Clinton.  

1860s     Union Academy was destroyed by fire during the American Civil War.

1868     A new Union Academy was constructed on the present site of Clinton Elementary School.

1895     The newly established Clinton City School system took over operations of the Academy building. By this time, the Academy was already being referred to as Clinton High School.

1903     A new brick Clinton High School was built on the current location of Clinton Elementary School.

1916–17      The first basketball teams were formed at Clinton High School (Men's & Women's).

1923–24     The first football team was organized at Clinton High School. They were known as the Orange and Black “Tornadoes.”

1927     A new high school building, which consolidated CHS with several county schools, was opened at the current location of Clinton Middle School. The city school system turned over operations of CHS to the county school system. At some point, the mascot was changed to “Dragons.” 

1954     Clinton High School first accredited by the Southern Association of Colleges and Schools (SACS).

1956     See Integration below.

1958     On Sunday, October 5, the school was blown apart by three massive explosions.

1958–60     CHS students were transported to Oak Ridge to continue classes  while the school was rebuilt.

1963     Plans were presented to consolidate several elementary schools, create 2 junior high schools, and construct a new Clinton Senior High School for grades 10-12.

1968–69     Clinton Senior High School was completed.

1977     Vocational programs were offered to CSHS students as the Anderson County Center of Occupational Development was opened.

1989     With the new addition of a library, science labs, a cafeteria, and several new classrooms, the 9th grade was moved to CSHS which again became Clinton High School.  (Clinton Junior High School and Norwood Junior High School became middle schools.)

Integration

In January 1956, federal judge Robert L. Taylor ordered Clinton High School to desegregate with "all deliberate speed" in accordance with the U.S. Supreme Court's 1954 ruling in Brown v. Board of Education. On August 27, 1956, 12 African-American students became the first to integrate a previously all-white school in Tennessee.

Anti-integration campaigners from inside and outside Clinton protested the decision to integrate the school. They were inspired by New Jersey white supremacist John Kasper and Asa Carter both of whom spoke publicly in Clinton on September 1, 1956 against the decision to integrate the high school.  After violence was narrowly averted on the lawn of the Anderson County Courthouse on September 1, National Guard troops were called into the city for two months to keep order. The protests resulted in a jury trial for criminal contempt, of which seven of ten defendants were convicted.

The twelve black students who attended Clinton High School that fall became known as the "Clinton 12".  On the morning of each school day they walked together down Broad Street from Foley Hill to Clinton High. On the morning of December 4, 1956, Rev. Paul Turner, the white minister of the First Baptist Church, was severely beaten after escorting the twelve students to school.  The twelve students were Jo Ann Boyce (née Allen), Bobby Cain, Theresser Caswell, Minnie Ann Jones (née Dickey), Gail Ann Upton (née Epps), Ronald Hayden, William Latham, Alvah J. Lambert (née McSwain), Maurice Soles, Robert Thacker, Regina Smith (née Turner), and Alfred Williams.  

On February 10, 2006, Williams, Cain, from Foley Hill to commemorate the 50th anniversary of the 1956 integration. A bronze statue of the "Clinton Twelve" is now displayed outside a newly remodeled front entrance to the former Green McAdoo School, where the twelve students had attended elementary school. In February 2016, Disney Channel and sister network Disney XD aired a short for Black History Month. In the short, Disney star Cameron Boyce, the grandson of Jo Ann Boyce, one of the Clinton 12 students, talked about the school. The short also featured his grandmother, Jo Ann Boyce.

Early in the morning of October 5, 1958, the Clinton High School building was severely damaged by a series of dynamite explosions. An estimated 75 to 100 sticks of dynamite had been placed in three locations in the building. No one was injured, but school officials estimated damages at $300,000. Clinton was once again the focus of attention over a crime that was universally assumed to be related to the school's desegregation. While the school was rebuilt, Clinton High School students were bused to Oak Ridge where the school operated in the recently vacated building that had housed Linden Elementary School. Clinton High School reopened in its own building in 1960.

The documentary The Clinton 12 is a historical review of these events, and was aired widely on PBS in 2008 and 2009. The members of the Clinton 12 were inducted into the Clinton High School Wall of Fame in 2005 (Bobby Cain), 2007 (Gail Ann Epps Upton) and 2010.

Athletics 
Clinton Dragons compete in TSSAA Class AAAAA of Region 3 in Football. They compete in Class TSSAA AAA in the following sports:

Baseball
Men's Basketball
Women's Basketball
Fishing
Football
Men's Golf
Women’s Golf
Softball
Men's Soccer
Women's Soccer
Track and Field
Volleyball
Wrestling

Environment

The school is also home to a prototype solar-powered classroom called the "Net-Zero Building". The small classroom, built by students under the direction of teacher Riley Sain, allows students to watch movies and more using the power of the sun. The school has also received multiple grants from various organizations, including the TWRA, to remove rip-rap from the creek in front of the school in an effort to return it to its natural state.

Notable alumni
 Charles McRae, former Tampa Bay Buccaneers and University of Tennessee lineman
 Larry Seivers, former Seattle Seahawks and University of Tennessee wide receiver
 Bobby Cain, a member of the Clinton 12 and the first African American student to graduate from a court-ordered state-supported high school in the South. https://www.knoxvilledailysun.com/news/2022/february/clinton-twelve.html.
 Gail Ann Epps, a member of the Clinton 12 and the first African-American female student to graduate from a court-ordered state-supported high school in the South. https://tnmuseum.org/junior-curators/posts/the-clinton-12-the-integration-story-of-tennessees-public-schools?locale=en_us.
 Alfred Williams, a member of the Clinton 12. https://tnmuseum.org/junior-curators/posts/the-clinton-12-the-integration-story-of-tennessees-public-schools?locale=en_us.
 Alvah Jay McSwain, a member of the Clinton 12. https://tnmuseum.org/junior-curators/posts/the-clinton-12-the-integration-story-of-tennessees-public-schools?locale=en_us.
 Anna Theresser Caswell, a member of the Clinton 12. https://tnmuseum.org/junior-curators/posts/the-clinton-12-the-integration-story-of-tennessees-public-schools?locale=en_us.
 Maurice Soles, a member of the Clinton 12. https://tnmuseum.org/junior-curators/posts/the-clinton-12-the-integration-story-of-tennessees-public-schools?locale=en_us.
 Minnie Ann Dickey, a member of the Clinton 12. https://tnmuseum.org/junior-curators/posts/the-clinton-12-the-integration-story-of-tennessees-public-schools?locale=en_us.
 Regina Turner, a member of the Clinton 12. https://tnmuseum.org/junior-curators/posts/the-clinton-12-the-integration-story-of-tennessees-public-schools?locale=en_us.
 Robert Thacker, a member of the Clinton 12. https://tnmuseum.org/junior-curators/posts/the-clinton-12-the-integration-story-of-tennessees-public-schools?locale=en_us.
 Ronald Gordon Hayden, a member of the Clinton 12. https://tnmuseum.org/junior-curators/posts/the-clinton-12-the-integration-story-of-tennessees-public-schools?locale=en_us.
 William Latham, a member of the Clinton 12. https://tnmuseum.org/junior-curators/posts/the-clinton-12-the-integration-story-of-tennessees-public-schools?locale=en_us.
 Jo Ann Allen, a member of the Clinton 12. https://tnmuseum.org/junior-curators/posts/the-clinton-12-the-integration-story-of-tennessees-public-schools?locale=en_us.

References

External links
Clinton High School official website
Information on Marching and Concert bands
CHS Class of 1964
Clinton Desegregation Crisis in Tennessee Encyclopedia of History and Culture
 
 
 

1903 establishments in Tennessee
Educational institutions established in 1903
African-American history of Tennessee
Public high schools in Tennessee
Schools in Anderson County, Tennessee
School segregation in the United States